is a 2010 Japanese thriller film directed by Junji Sakamoto, starring Toru Nakamura and Manami Konishi. It is based on the novel of the same title by Tatsuo Shimizu.

Cast
 Tōru Nakamura as Hatano
 Manami Konishi as Masako
 Nao Minamisawa as Yukari
 Yosuke Kubozuka as Nakagome
 Renji Ishibashi as Ikebe
 Shun Sugata as Omori
 Kyoko Enami as Masako's mother
 Arata Iura as Masako's boyfriend
 Tetta Sugimoto as Hatano's former colleague
 Eriko Sato as Hatano's former colleague
 Mitsuki Tanimura as Yukari's friend

Release
Strangers in the City premiered at the Busan International Film Festival on October 11, 2010. It also screened as the North American premiere at the Japan Cuts on July 17, 2011.

Reception
Mark Schilling of The Japan Times criticized Strangers in the City, noting that the director Junji Sakamoto and the screenwriter Shoichi Maruyama could not decide what the film is about. Meanwhile, Russell Edwards of Variety said, "[Manami] Konishi exhibits a powerful range of suppressed emotions as Hatano's former child bride-cum-Tokyo bargirl."

References

External links
 

2010 films
Films directed by Junji Sakamoto
2010 crime thriller films
Japanese romance films
Japanese crime thriller films
Toei Company films
2010s Japanese films